Young Men Gone West is the third album by British band City Boy, released in 1977 on Vertigo Records in Europe and on Mercury Records in the United States and Canada.

Critical reception
The New Rolling Stone Record Guide wrote that the album "provided the group's finest, liveliest playing and writing, and made tentative steps toward a unique style."

Track listing

Side 1
 "Dear Jean (I'm Nervous)" (Lol Mason, Mike Slamer) - 5:33
 "Bordello Night" (Steve Broughton) - 3:04
 "Honeymooners" (Lol Mason, Mike Slamer) - 3:55
 "She's Got Style" (Lol Mason, Max Thomas) - 3:23
 "Bad For Business" (Lol Mason, Steve Broughton) - 3:33

Note: On American and Canadian issues the two first tracks are in reverse order, i.e. "Bordello Night" before "Dear Jean".

Side 2
 "Young Men Gone West" (Lol Mason, Max Thomas) - 4:05
 "I've Been Spun" (Steve Broughton) - 3:19
 "One After Two" (Lol Mason, Max Thomas) - 3:27
 "The Runaround" (Lol Mason, Steve Broughton) - 3:16
 "The Man Who Ate His Car" (Bishton, Max Thomas) - 3:00
 "Millionaire" (Lol Mason, Steve Broughton) - 4:28

Personnel
City Boy
Lol Mason - lead and backing vocals
Mike Slamer - electric and acoustic 12-string guitars, lead vocals, mandolin 
Steve Broughton - acoustic 6-string guitars, lead and backing vocals
Max Thomas - keyboards, lead and backing vocals, piano, harmonium, organ, synthesizer
Chris Dunn - bass guitar, guitar
Tony Braunagel - drums, percussion

Cherry Red reissue
Cherry Red's Lemon Recordings announced in May 2015 plans to reissue City Boy's first four album releases as double CDs with bonus tracks. Release date was set for 17 July 2015.

Young Men Gone West (disc 1) and Book Early (disc 2) are complemented by two bonus tracks on disc 2. New sleeve notes are provided by Malcolm Dome.

Press releases inform these releases are re-mastered from original tapes, and that this is the first official release of these albums on CD.

In his regular reviews for Truck & Driver magazine, starting a four of five star review, Shaun Connors wrote, "City Boy are probably most known for their 1978 Top 10 single 5.7.0.5. and little else, but there is so much more to this Midlands 1970s proggy-poprock outfit than the one-hit wonder status they are so unfairly labelled with, continuing with As two double-CDs, the first four of seven City Boy albums have been reissued by Cherry Red, this offering by far the most accomplished and listenable of the two."

References

1977 albums
City Boy (band) albums
Albums produced by Robert John "Mutt" Lange
Mercury Records albums
Vertigo Records albums